The 1970 Texas A&M Aggies football team represented Texas A&M University in the 1970 NCAA University Division football season as a member of the Southwest Conference (SWC). The Aggies were led by head coach Gene Stallings in his sixth season and finished with a record of two wins and nine losses (2–9 overall, 0–7 in the SWC).

Schedule

Personnel

Season summary

Wichita State

at LSU

at Ohio State

at Michigan

References

Texas AandM
Texas A&M Aggies football seasons
Texas AandM Aggies football